102nd Squadron may refer to:

 No. 102 Squadron RAF, of the United Kingdom's Royal Air Force
 102 Squadron (Israel), of the Israeli Air Force
 102nd Squadron (JASDF), of the Japanese Air Self-Defense Force
 102nd Squadron (Portugal), of the Portuguese Air Force
 No. 102 Squadron RAAF, of the Royal Australian Air Force
 102d Rescue Squadron, of the New York Air National Guard
 VFA-102, of the United States Navy